"I'm on One" is a song by American hip hop artist DJ Khaled, released as the second single from his fifth studio album, We the Best Forever. The hip hop song features Canadian rapper Drake and American rappers Rick Ross and Lil Wayne and features production from Canadian producers T-Minus, Nikhil S. and Noah "40" Shebib. It was released for digital download in the United States on May 20, 2011.

The song peaked at number ten on the Billboard Hot 100, becoming the first top-ten hit in the United States for both DJ Khaled and Rick Ross. The single was certified gold by the Recording Industry Association of America (RIAA) for sales of over 500,000 copies.

Music video
DJ Khaled shot the music video for his "I'm On One" single featuring Drake, Rick Ross, and Lil' Wayne. The visual was directed by Gil Green, with Birdman, Ace Hood, Wale, Gunplay and Mack Maine making cameos. The visual was shot in Miami in Drake's Condo House over Memorial Day Weekend. Various scenes in the video include the controversial drink Four Loko.
The official music video for "I'm on One" was premiered during the BET Awards 2011. A video for the song's remix features a cameo from Ace Hood.

Critical reception 
"I'm on One" was nominated at the 2012 Grammy Awards for the Best Rap/Sung Collaboration award, being Khaled and Ross' first nomination, Drake's  8th and Lil Wayne's 12th, but lost to "All of the Lights" by Kanye West featuring Rihanna. XXL named this song the second best song of 2011. Billboard also ranked it at number 17 on their "Critics' Picks: 20 Best Songs of 2011."

Chart performance
I'm on One peaked at number ten on the US Billboard Hot 100, becoming his sixth highest-peaking song and first top-ten hit in the United States for both DJ Khaled and Rick Ross. The song also topped the US Hot R&B/Hip-Hop Songs chart for 11 weeks, and the Hot Rap Songs chart for 13 consecutive weeks, which is the fourth-longest streak on that chart, behind Drake's "Best I Ever Had" at 15 weeks, Lil Nas X's "Old Town Road" at 17 and Missy Elliott's "Hot Boyz", featuring Nas, Eve and Q-Tip at 18. On July 22, 2011, the single was certified gold by the Recording Industry Association of America (RIAA) for sales of over 500,000 copies. As of May 2014, the song has sold 1,875,000 copies in the United States.

Charts

Weekly charts

Year-end charts

Decade-end charts

Certifications

Release history

Trust Issues 

Drake used an excerpt from the single on the track "Trust Issues", 
included in his first compilation album, Care Package (2019).

Charts

See also
 List of number-one R&B singles of 2011 (U.S.)
 List of number-one rap singles of 2011 (U.S.)

References

External links

2011 singles
DJ Khaled songs
Drake (musician) songs
Songs written by Drake (musician)
Rick Ross songs
Lil Wayne songs
Songs written by Lil Wayne
Song recordings produced by 40 (record producer)
Song recordings produced by T-Minus (record producer)
Music videos directed by Gil Green
Cash Money Records singles
Songs written by Rick Ross
Songs written by DJ Khaled
Songs written by 40 (record producer)
2011 songs
Songs written by Nikhil Seetharam